The 1992 Japanese Formula 3000 Championship was contested over 11 rounds. 21 different teams, 34 different drivers, 4 different chassis and 3 different engines competed.

Calendar

All races took place at venues located within the country of Japan.

Note:
Race 4 shortened because of a crash on Lap 27 between Hitoshi Ogawa and Andrew Gilbert Scott that killed Ogawa, past the 75% distance rule.

Final point standings

Driver

For every race points were awarded: 9 points to the winner, 6 for runner-up, 4 for third place, 3 for fourth place, 2 for fifth place and 1 for sixth place. No additional points were awarded. The best 7 results count.

Complete overview

R25=retired, but classified R=retired NC=not classified NS=did not start NQ=did not qualify DIS=disqualified (21)=place after practice, but grid position not held free

Formula 3000
Super Formula